The use of convict ships to New South Wales began on 18 August 1786, when the decision was made to send a colonisation party of convicts, military, and civilian personnel to Botany Bay. Transportation to the Colony of New South Wales was finally officially abolished on 1 October 1850.
This list reflects vessels that transported convicts to New South Wales as currently represented, it does not include transportations to colonies or ports that were once part of New South Wales.

A

B

C

D

E

F

G

H

I

J

K

L

M

N

O

P

Q

R

S

T

U

V

W

Y

See also
Convict ships to Norfolk Island
Convict ships to Tasmania

References